Riders of the Law is a 1922 American silent Western film directed by Robert N. Bradbury and starring Jack Hoxie, Marin Sais and Frank Rice.

Synopsis
A man battles whiskey smugglers near the Canadian border.

Cast
 Jack Hoxie as Jack Meadows
 Marin Sais as Barbara Layne
 Frank Rice as Toby Jones
 Pat Harmon as Deputy Dan Silo 
 Thomas G. Lingham as Sheriff Layne 
 Jack P. Pierce as Pete Gushard 
 Frank Jonasson as Ace Brokaw
 Sonny Hicks as Young Boy

References

Bibliography
 Munden, Kenneth White. The American Film Institute Catalog of Motion Pictures Produced in the United States, Part 1. University of California Press, 1997.

External links
 

1922 films
1922 Western (genre) films
American black-and-white films
1920s English-language films
Films directed by Robert N. Bradbury
Silent American Western (genre) films
1920s American films